The Walkley Award for Journalism Leadership is an Australian award that recognises outstanding acts of courage and bravery in the practice of journalism, in the prestigious Walkley Awards series. The inaugural award, for Excellence in News Leadership, was made in 1997. It became the award for Excellence in Journalism Leadership in 1998.

In 2017 the Walkley Foundation announced that due to a reorganisation of  categories, the Journalism Leadership award would no longer be given out.

List of winners

See also 
 Walkley Awards

References

Australian journalism awards
 Walkley Award for Journalism Leadership
Awards established in 1997
1997 establishments in Australia